Josef Moser is an Austrian lawyer and politician. He served as the Minister of Justice of Austria from 18. December 2017 until 3. June 2019.

References  

20th-century Austrian lawyers
Government ministers of Austria
1955 births
Living people
People from Lienz
Austrian People's Party politicians
Justice ministers of Austria
21st-century Austrian politicians